Alvin Jackson (born July 29, 1943) is an American former professional basketball player. He played in the National Basketball Association for the Cincinnati Royals in two games at the start of the 1967–68 season.

Jackson started his collegiate career at Central State University, but then transferred and played out the remainder of his college days at Wilberforce University.

References

1943 births
Living people
Amateur Athletic Union men's basketball players
American men's basketball players
Basketball players from Cleveland
Central State Marauders basketball players
Cincinnati Royals players
Forwards (basketball)
Undrafted National Basketball Association players
Wilberforce Bulldogs men's basketball players
Wilmington Blue Bombers players